Tinkering with Trouble is a 1915 American short comedy film featuring Harold Lloyd.

Cast
 Harold Lloyd - Lonesome Luke aka Easy Otis
 Snub Pollard - (as Harry Pollard)
 Gene Marsh  
 Bebe Daniels

See also
 Harold Lloyd filmography

External links

1915 films
American silent short films
1915 comedy films
1915 short films
American black-and-white films
Films directed by Hal Roach
Lonesome Luke films
American comedy short films
1910s American films
Silent American comedy films